Dorlombos is a village in the municipality of Strumica, North Macedonia. It used to be part of the former municipality of Kukliš.

Demographics
As of the 2021 census, Dorlombos had 52 residents with the following ethnic composition:
Turks 49
Others 2
Persons for whom data are taken from administrative sources 1

According to the 2002 census, the village had a total of 117 inhabitants. Ethnic groups in the village include:
Turks 117

References

Villages in Strumica Municipality
Turkish communities in North Macedonia